Gerardus Budisatrio Djiwandono (born 25 September 1981) is an Indonesian politician who has been serving in the People's Representative Council since 2017. A member of the Gerindra party, he is currently a Deputy Chairman of the legislature's fourth commission on agriculture, environmental, forestry, and maritime affairs.

Early life and education 
Gerardus Budisatrio Djiwandono was born on 25 September 1981 in Jakarta, Indonesia, the younger son of Soedradjad Djiwandono and Biantiningsih Djojohadikusumo. His father is an economist who has served as Governor of Bank Indonesia during the New Order era. His mother is the younger sister of the currently-appointed Indonesian Defense Minister Prabowo Djojohadikusumo. He has an older brother, Thomas, who is a fellow politician.

Djiwandono received his early education at the Saint Theresia and Pelita Harapan schools in Indonesia, and later on at the Berkshire School in Sheffield, Massachusetts. While at Berkshire, he was a member of the men's squash team. He pursued higher studies at Clark University in Worcester, graduating with a bachelor of arts degree in government and international relations in 2004.

Career 
Prior to a political career, Djiwandono ventured in several businesses in the sectors of plantations, mining, and agriculture. He has held several positions which include Deputy Director of PT Nusantara Energy and PT Kertas Nusantara, Director of PT Nusantara Pandu Energi and PT Karunia Tidar Abadi, as well as Commissioner of PT Satrio Putra Tidar. He later became a member of the Gerindra Tunas Indonesia Raya (TIDAR) youth wing organization, during which he was appointed Deputy Chairman from 2008 to 2016.

Legislature 
In 2014, Djiwandono ran in the Indonesian legislative election for the constituency of East Kalimantan, after which he secured a seat at the People's Representative Council. Upon the death of his predecessor Luther Kombong, he was appointed as an inter-time substitute (PAW) member of the council, and since 2019, has been serving as the Gerindra party's Deputy Chairman in the fourth commission. The committee has the scope of tasks in the fields of agriculture, environment, forestry, and maritime affairs.

Other organizations 
Apart from his entrepreneurial and political endeavours, Djiwandono is also a part of the organizational body of the Indonesian Basketball Association. He has been serving as General Treasurer from 2015 to 2016 and as Secretary General from 2016 to 2019.

References 

1981 births
Living people
Clark University alumni
Great Indonesia Movement Party politicians
Members of the People's Representative Council, 2014
Members of the People's Representative Council, 2019